The 2017–18 Old Dominion Monarchs men’s basketball team represented Old Dominion University during the 2017–18 NCAA Division I men's basketball season. The Monarchs, led by fifth-year head coach Jeff Jones, played their home games at the Ted Constant Convocation Center in Norfolk, Virginia as members of Conference USA. They finished the season 25–7, 15–3 in C-USA play to finish in second place. They defeated Louisiana Tech in the quarterfinals of the C-USA Tournament before losing to Western Kentucky in the semifinals. Despite winning 25 games on the season, the Monarchs did not participate in a postseason tournament.

Previous season 
The Monarchs finished the 2016–17 season 19–12, 12–6 in C-USA play to finish tied for third place. They lost in the quarterfinals of the C-USA tournament to Marshall. ODU did not participate in a postseason tournament for the first time since the 2012–13 season.

Offseason

Departures

Incoming transfers

2017 recruiting class

Roster

Schedule and results 

|-
!colspan=12 style=| Exhibition

|-
!colspan=12 style=|Non-conference regular season

|-
!colspan=12 style=| Conference USA regular season

|-
!colspan=12 style=| Conference USA tournament

Source

References

Old Dominion Monarchs men's basketball seasons
Old Dominion
Old Dominion Monarchs basketball team
Old Dominion Monarchs basketball team